LaWanda Lindsey (born January 12, 1953) is an American country music singer.

Born in Tampa, Florida, United States, she began her career at age 14 and had her first nationally charted record at age 16 with "Partly Bill".  She was one of several quite young artists recording country music for Chart Records during this period, and was paired with country singer-songwriter Kenny Vernon, to record a number of duets. She got her start singing on WEAS-AM radio station in Savannah, Georgia, where her father, Norman H. "Lefty" Lindsey, was the general manager and on-air personality.  In 1973, she became a protégé of Buck Owens and began recording for Capitol Records, later in 1977-1978 she was on Mercury Records.

From 1969 to 1978, LaWanda Lindsey placed 14 songs on the Billboard country chart, but only two of her songs ("Pickin' Wild Mountain Berries" in 1970 and "Hello Out There" in 1973) placed in the top 30.  She nevertheless had a mid-level career in the industry before retiring in 1979.

Discography

Albums

Singles

Singles from collaboration albums

References 

American country singer-songwriters
American women country singers
Musicians from Tampa, Florida
1953 births
Living people
Singer-songwriters from Florida
Country musicians from Florida
21st-century American women